North Decatur is a census-designated place (CDP) in DeKalb County, Georgia, United States. The population was 16,698 at the 2010 census.

Geography
North Decatur is located at  (33.803054, -84.290123).

According to the United States Census Bureau, the CDP has a total area of 5.0 square miles (12.9 km), all land. The North Decatur CDP's boundaries are:
 South: the city of Decatur
 West: CSX railroad and Clairmont Road, across which are the North Druid Hills and Druid Hills CDPs
 North:  LaVista Road and Pangborn Road, across which are neighborhoods mostly inside the Tucker CCD
 East: Lawrenceville Highway and DeKalb Industrial Way, across which is mostly the Scottdale CDP.

There is no true center to North Decatur; there are three commercial clusters at corners of the CDP:
 The student-oriented commercial district at Clairmont Road and North Decatur Road at the southwest corner of the CDP
 the Toco Hills retail cluster at North Druid Hills Road and Lavista Road at the northwest corner, and 
 North DeKalb Mall and adjacent shopping centers along Lawrenceville Highway at the northeast corner of the district.

Toco Hills, a de facto commercial center for several CDPs north of the city of Decatur, has grown from a country store in 1950, with a single gas pump and a pot-bellied stove, to multiple shopping centers, coffee houses, houses of worship and townhouses.

North Decatur primarily consists of 1950s and 1960s-era ranch homes, although condominiums are increasingly being developed in this community. Its proximity to Atlanta's Midtown and Buckhead districts, as well as Emory University and Decatur, makes it a desirable "in-town" location for what was originally developed as a suburban community.

Demographics

2020 census

As of the 2020 United States census, there were 18,511 people, 8,169 households, and 3,518 families residing in the CDP.

2000 census
As of the census of 2000, there were 15,270 people, 7,974 households, and 3,333 families residing in the CDP. The racial makeup of the CDP was 83.79% White, 8.04% African American, 0.25% Native American, 5.73% Asian, 0.06% Pacific Islander, 0.65% from other races, and 1.49% from two or more races. Hispanic or Latino of any race were 2.81% of the population.

There were 7,974 households, out of which 14.2% had children under the age of 18 living with them, 33.5% were married couples living together, 6.3% had a female householder with no husband present, and 58.2% were non-families. 45.5% of all households were made up of individuals, and 17.3% had someone living alone who was 65 years of age or older.  The average household size was 1.85 and the average family size was 2.61.

In the CDP, the population was spread out, with 12.6% under the age of 18, 8.4% from 18 to 24, 36.2% from 25 to 44, 20.6% from 45 to 64, and 22.2% who were 65 years of age or older.  The median age was 40 years. For every 100 females, there were 77.3 males.  For every 100 females age 18 and over, there were 74.4 males.

The median income for a household in the CDP was $50,047, and the median income for a family was $66,073. Males had a median income of $46,753 versus $38,955 for females. The per capita income for the CDP was $33,739.  About 3.6% of families and 8.2% of the population were below the poverty line, including 2.3% of those under age 18 and 4.5% of those age 65 or over.

History
An early settler in this part of DeKalb County was Chapman Powell, whose "Medicine House" cabin was built near 1218 Clairmont Road. (It has been preserved and relocated to Stone Mountain Park.) Dr. Powell (1798-1870) owned most of the land in the Candler Lake and South Fork Peachtree Creek area during his lifetime. His land was later purchased by Walter Candler.

Ezekiel Mason built a mill on the east side of Clairmont Road on Burnt Fork Creek. DeKalb County's Mason Mill Park, as well as local eatery Mason Tavern, are named after Ezekiel Mason.

Education
DeKalb County Schools serves the CDP. Some residents are zoned to Laurel Ridge Elementary School, while other residents are zoned to Medlock Elementary School; both are in the North Decatur CDP. Residents zoned to Laurel Ridge and Medlock are also zoned to Druid Hills Middle School (in the North Decatur CDP) and Druid Hills High School (in the Druid Hills CDP).

Neighborhoods
 Clairmont Heights. Located roughly between North Decatur Rd, Clairmont Rd, Mason Mill Park, and Willivee Dr.  
 Country Squire Court. Located off of Pangborn Rd., SE of the railroad tracks.
 Druid Lake. New upscale neighborhood off North Druid Hills Rd., surrounded by North Druid Valley.
 Leafmore-Creek Park Hills. Neighborhood located between North Druid Hills Rd., Clairmont Rd., LaVista Rd. & the railroad tracks 
 Medlock Park. The neighborhood located north of North Decatur Rd., east of Scott Blvd. and west of Clairmont Rd., around the DeKalb County park of the same name.
 North Druid Valley. Small neighborhood centered on Homewood Court, south of North Druid Hills Rd. 
 North Druid Woods. Large neighborhood NW of the intersection of North Druid Hills Rds. & Lawrenceville Hwy.
 Ridgeland Park. Located between North Decatur Rd. and Decatur’s city limits.
 Springdale Heights. Located off of Sycamore Heights in the Decatur Heights community. 
 Tuxworth Springs. A condo complex off of Scott Blvd.
 University Heights. Neighborhood located north of North Decatur Rd. around Willivee.
 Valley Brook Estates. Neighborhood between Lawrenceville Highway & Stone Mountain Freeway, near East Ponce de Leon, & off McLendon.
 Winston Place. A condo complex off of LaVista.

Parks
 Clyde Shepherd Nature Preserve, 2580 Pine Bluff Dr. A nature preserve between Medlock Park, University Heights and the Medlock neighborhood.
 Mason Mill Park, 1340 McConnell Dr.  DeKalb County park with tennis courts, recreation center, picnic area and trails. Also view the ruins of the 1906 Decatur Waterworks, used by the City of Decatur as a drinking water source until the 1940s.
 Medlock Park, 874 Gaylemont Cir.  Dekalb County park with baseball & softball fields, multi-use field, multi-use court, playground, swimming pool and picnic area.

Transportation
  LaVista Road. Northern boundary of North Decatur CDP.
  Lawrenceville Highway. Primary access from Interstate 285, and the eastern boundary of the North Decatur CDP.
  North Decatur Rd.  Primary E-W road providing access from Emory University.
  North Druid Hills Rd. Primary NW-SE road that provides access from Interstate 85 and Stone Mountain Freeway, respectively.

Churches
 Clairmont Hills Baptist Church (SBC), 1995 Clairmont Rd.
 North Decatur United Methodist Church (UMC), 1523 Church St.
 North Decatur Presbyterian Church (PCUSA), 611 Medlock Rd.
 Scott Boulevard Baptist Church (CBF), 2532 N Decatur Rd.
 St. Paul Baptist Church, 1396 Nelms Dr.

References

External links
 Clairmont Heights Civic Association
 Laurel Ridge Civic Association
 Leafmore-Creek Park Hills Neighborhood Association
 Medlock Area Neighborhood Association
 North Druid Valley Neighborhood Association

Census-designated places in DeKalb County, Georgia
Census-designated places in Georgia (U.S. state)
Census-designated places in the Atlanta metropolitan area